The 1945 Pacific Tigers football team was an American football team that represented the College of the Pacific—now known as the University of the Pacific—in Stockton, California as an independent during the 1945 college football season. In their 13th season under head coach Amos Alonzo Stagg, the Tigers compiled a record of 0–10–1.  The Tigers played home games at Baxter Stadium in Stockton.

Schedule

References

Pacific
Pacific Tigers football seasons
College football winless seasons
Pacific Tigers football